Alan North (December 23, 1920 – January 19, 2000) was an American actor.

Early life
North was born in Bronx, New York, and joined the United States Navy during the Second World War.

Career 
After the war, he became a stage manager and made his Broadway debut in 1955 in Plain and Fancy.

His film career included roles in Plaza Suite (1971), Serpico (1973), The Formula (1980), Trackdown: Finding the Goodbar Killer (1983), Thief of Hearts (1984), Highlander (1986), Act of Vengeance (1986), Billy Galvin (1986), The Fourth Protocol (1987), Lean on Me (1989), See No Evil, Hear No Evil (1989), Glory (1989) and The Long Kiss Goodnight (1996). On television, he played Captain Ed Hocken in the 1982 television series Police Squad!. He also appeared on the soap opera Another World in the recurring role of Captain Sean Delaney from 1984 to 1988. His last stage performance was in 1999, in Lake Hollywood.

Personal life 
North died of lung and kidney cancer in a hospital in Port Jefferson, New York on January 19, 2000, at the age of 79. He and his wife June North had two daughters, Alexandra Jackson and Victoria North.

Filmography

Film

Television

References

External links
 
 

1920 births
2000 deaths
American male film actors
Deaths from kidney cancer
Deaths from lung cancer in New York (state)
United States Navy sailors
United States Navy personnel of World War II
People from the Bronx
People from Port Jefferson, New York
Male actors from New York City
20th-century American male actors